Harvansh Singh (November 11, 1949 – May 14, 2013) was an Indian politician.

He was born in the village of Bindrai, Chhindwara district, Madhya Pradesh state, India. He was a farmer by profession, and held a graduate degree in Commerce & Law and a postgraduate degree in Arts.

Singh initially held the position of President of the Seoni district Youth Congress Committee in 1971. He then was the vice-president of MP State Handloom from 1983 to 1986, and chairman from 1986 to 1988. He was president of Pradesh Congress Sevadal from 1986 to 1989, and became chairman of Madhya Pradesh Textile Corporation.

Singh then had a long career in politics. He became General Secretary of the Madhya Pradesh Congress Committee in 1992. In 1993, Singh was elected a member of the Madhya Pradesh Legislative Assembly from Keolari constituency. He held the key portfolios of Public Health Engineering, Transport, and the Home department. He was also a Cabinet minister during the Digvijaya Singh Government in the state.

Death
Singh died of a heart attack on May 14, 2013.  He is survived by his wife Pawan Bai and three children.

References

1949 births
2013 deaths
People from Chhindwara district
Madhya Pradesh MLAs 1993–1998
Deputy Speakers of the Madhya Pradesh Legislative Assembly
Madhya Pradesh MLAs 1998–2003
Madhya Pradesh MLAs 2003–2008
Madhya Pradesh MLAs 2008–2013
Indian National Congress politicians from Madhya Pradesh